Monte Bo (or Cima di Bo) is  a mountain in  the Alpi Biellesi, a sub-range of Pennine Alps.

Geography 
The mountain is located between Sessera and Cervo valleys and is totally included in the province of Biella.  It is divided between the comune of Piedicavallo and the mountain exclaves of Pettinengo, Tavigliano and Valle San Nicolao.

SOIUSA classification 
According to the SOIUSA (International Standardized Mountain Subdivision of the Alps) the mountain can be classified in the following way:
 main part = Western Alps
 major sector = North Western Alps
 section = Pennine Alps
 subsection = Southern  Valsesia Alps
 supergroup = Alpi Biellesi
 group = Catena Tre Vescovi - Mars
 subgroup = Costiera Bo-Cravile-Monticchio
 code = I/B-9.IV-A.2.b

With an elevation of 2,556 m it's the second highest peak of the Province of Biella after Monte Mars (2,600 m).

Access to the summit

The easiest route for the summit is a long but well marked footpath starting from Montesinaro, a village belonging to Piedicavallo township.
Nearby the mountain's top is located Bivacco Antoniotti, an emergency mountain shelter.

The summit of the Bo is a well known hiking destination, and since the 19th century it has been celebrated because:

 It commands a vast and varied panorama of the Alps and plains, which has been engraved by the Italian Alpine Club. 

Maps
 Italian official cartography (Istituto Geografico Militare - IGM); on-line version: www.pcn.minambiente.it
 Provincia di Biella cartography: Carta dei sentieri della Provincia di Biella, 1:25.00 scale, 2004; on line version:  webgis.provincia.biella.it
 Carta dei sentieri e dei rifugi, 1:50.000 scale, nr. 9 Ivrea, Biella e Bassa Valle d'Aosta'', Istituto Geografico Centrale - Torino

References

External links 
 
 

Mountains of the Biellese Alps
Mountains of Piedmont
Two-thousanders of Italy